Rusna is a village situated in Doljevac municipality in Serbia. The town has a population of 516. It is near the town of Niš and near the Danube River. The town is nestled in the hills and medium high mountains of central Serbia.

, References

Populated places in Nišava District